Balcı is a quarter of the town Ortaköy, Ortaköy District, Aksaray Province, Turkey. Its population is 1,071 (2021). Before the 2013 reorganisation, it was a town (belde).

References

Ortaköy District, Aksaray